Howard Hutchinson (1921-2012) was an association football player who represented New Zealand at international level.

Hutchinson made his full All Whites debut in a 3–8 loss to South Africa on 12 July 1947 and ended his international playing career with four A-international caps to his credit, his final cap an appearance in a 1–8 loss to Australia on 11 September 1948.

References 

1921 births
2012 deaths
New Zealand association footballers
New Zealand international footballers
Association footballers not categorized by position